, (named A 430 until the early 1990s) is one of the most used Autobahns in Germany. It crosses the Dutch-German border as a continuation of the Dutch A67 and crosses the Rhine, leads through the Ruhr valley toward Bochum, becoming B 1 (Bundesstraße 1) at the Kreuz Dortmund West and eventually merging into the A 44 near Holzwickede.

It has officially been named Ruhrschnellweg (Ruhr Fast Way), but locals usually call it Ruhrschleichweg (Ruhr Crawling Way) or "the Ruhr area's longest parking lot". According to Der Spiegel, it is the most congested motorway in Germany.

In the city of Essen, a Stadtbahn service operates on the median of the A 40 between Tunnel Ruhrschnellweg and Mülheim-Heißen. Between the Essen-Huttrop and the Essen-Kray junctions, there is a guided bus system called Spurbus.

Exit list

|Netherlands
|-
|colspan="3"|

 	

 (Märkische Straße)

 (Semerteichstraße)

 (Marsbruchstraße) 

 (Leni-Rommel-Straße)

 (Köln-Berliner-Straße)

 Flughafen Dortmund Airport

 Dortmund / Unna
|}

References

External links 

40
A040